Charles Calvin Moore (February 26, 1866 – March 19, 1958) was the 13th governor of Idaho, serving from 1923 until 1927. He later served as Commissioner of the General Land Office from 1929 to 1933.

Biography
Moore was born in Holt County, Missouri. He attended public school and a teachers' training school. He married Minnie McCoy and they had four children. She died in 1909;  and he later married Clara W. Wallan.

Career
Moore was deputy county assessor in 1894, and a county auditor from 1895 to 1898. He moved to Idaho in 1899, where he taught school and worked in real estate. Moore co-founded the town of Ashton, Idaho.

Moore served in the Idaho Legislature as a member of the Idaho State House of Representatives from 1903 to 1906. He was postmaster of Saint Anthony from 1908 to 1913.   He was elected the 14th Lieutenant Governor of Idaho in 1918 and served in that capacity during the administration of Governor D. W. Davis.

In 1922 Moore was elected Governor of Idaho, defeating Progressive H. F. Samuels and former Democratic Governor Moses Alexander. Moore became the first person in Idaho history to successfully run for governor after serving as lieutenant governor. He was reelected in 1924, by defeating Samuels and Democrat A. L. Freehafer.

After leaving office, Moore returned to his real estate career. In 1929, he was appointed to as the United States Commissioner of the General Land Office.

Death
Moore died from a stroke on March 19, 1958, in Saint Anthony, Idaho. He is interred at the Mount Olivet Cemetery, Salt Lake City, Utah.

References

External links

Idaho Genealogy Trails
National Governors Association

1866 births
1958 deaths
County auditors in the United States
General Land Office Commissioners
Republican Party governors of Idaho
Lieutenant Governors of Idaho
Republican Party members of the Idaho House of Representatives
People from Holt County, Missouri
American city founders
People from St. Anthony, Idaho
20th-century American politicians